The Proximity Effect is the second album by the alternative rock band Nada Surf. It was released by Elektra Records in Europe in 1998, and by MarDev in North America in August 2000.

Recording
Finding no radio-friendly single on the album, Elektra asked the band to write a hit, had them record covers of other artists, and tried to push Why Are You So Mean To Me? as the first single. The band refused and, after its release in Europe in September 1998, the band did a 30-show tour in France in early 1999. Elektra dropped the band, initially setting a high purchase price for the rights to the album. The band eventually released the album in the United States via their own label, MarDev, in 2000.

Critical reception
AllMusic concluded that "while there are times where The Proximity Effect tries to break out of the limiting corner of the alt-rock universe it's staked for itself (like the power pop rave-up 'Why Are You So Mean to Me?'), more often than not it returns to the familiar, and assumingly comforting, haven of angst-free pop."

Track listing

1998 Elektra version

2000 MarDev version

Details
The album's re-issue has the last two tracks take the place of both of the covers found on the original release.

References

Nada Surf albums
1998 albums